Mujibur Rahman Monju (died 18 May 2015) was a Bangladesh Nationalist Party politician and the former Member of Parliament of Kishoreganj-6.

Career
Monju was elected to parliament from Kishoreganj-6 as a Bangladesh Nationalist Party candidate in 1996 and 2001.

Death
Monju died on 18 May 2015 in Jahurul Islam Medical College, Bhagalpur, Bajitpur Upazila, Kishoreganj District, Bangladesh.

References

2015 deaths
Bangladesh Nationalist Party politicians
6th Jatiya Sangsad members
7th Jatiya Sangsad members
8th Jatiya Sangsad members
People from Kishoreganj District